The concept of the Silk Road has fascinated Europeans for more than a century, symbolizing the exchange between the West and the East since Antiquity. However, the issue of what route was followed by it was not an easy one to resolve. The first person to explore this in detail was Aurel Stein, coming from the west through Kashgar and entering the Taklamakan desert in September 1900, before heading south to Khotan on his first expedition to Serindia. Stein was to come back several times, extending his research area to increase the known sites along the Silk Road in this region.

It was during those expeditions that Stein suggested that the Silk Road had several routes, with two of them going through the Taklamakan, one to the north and one to the south, and that these may have operated at different times.

The establishment of a southern route 

We do not know exactly when the South Taklamakan Route was first used, but silk from c 1500 BC has been found in Bactria, suggesting the use of the route very early in history. Khotan was possibly the source of nephrite for China as early as 645 BC. However, from historical sources, such as the writings from Sima Qian, it seems the route was poorly known before the 2nd century BC and that it importance was during the Han period, when Khotan had garrisons to protect it. The importance that this route had is illustrated by the bronze Sino-Kharosthi coins, based on the tetradrachm from the 1st century AD, that have been found in Khotan, suggesting an already well established relationship between China and the Indo-Greek empires through Khotan in the beginning of the Han era. Moreover, it seems from Mitochondrial DNA analyses that Central Asian population share genes with East Asians and Europeans, suggesting regular contacts between them. The foundation of Khotan is seen as reflecting a marriage between an Indian and a Chinese,. All these factors suggest that interaction between Khotan and its neighbours, whether to the south, west or east had taken place over a protracted period of time.

Why go South

The importance of Khotan 

Khotan was a source of nephrite, a material much valued in China since the Hongshan period. In Spring and Summer, when the ice melts on the Kunlun mountains, and the water flows in Khotan, large nephrite boulders are brought down (which explains the name of the two rivers flowing in Yoktan: Karakash (Black Jade) and Yurungkash (White Jade)). Khotan was also an important Buddhist centre; with its mythical creation during the reign of Asoka. Later numerous Chinese monks came to Khotan in order to study the scriptures stored there, some in early Brahmi forms.

Topography and climate 

The Kunlun Mountains bordering the southern edge of Khotan brought water into the region. Shade from the Kunlun Mountains (nearly 6,000 meters on the high edges bordering the Taklamakan desert near Yotkan) was probably well appreciated on the route. They were able to provide a more stable environment for the kingdom, located as it was in a valley system, where the temperatures ranges from -10° Celsius to 0° Celsius in January (the coldest month) and from 20° celsius to 30° celsius in July (the hottest month). It is heavily contrasting with the temperature at the center of the desert than can go as low as - 24° Celsius and as high as 40° celsius. The existence of a myriad of small oases in the desert was probably used by caravans and many such small oases were represented on Aurel Stein's maps.

Unstable politics 

Political instabilities affected both the northern and the southern routes at different times. For example, the Northern routes were disrupted by the upheavals during the rise of the Uyghur and First Turkic Khaganates. However, the southern route was also disrupted, for example during the expansion of the Tibetan Empire in the late 7th to 8th-century CE.

The Route 

There is little doubt that any east-west route would have passed through Anxi and Dunhuang, before dividing to the northern and southern routes around the Taklamakan Desert. Letters, such as one from the king of Khotan giving his daughter to the ruling family of Dunghuang in AD 941, suggest that the links between these areas were strong. From Dunhuang the most likely route would go to Miran (which became a Tibetan city, from which numerous written records from the late seventh and eighth century AD have been recovered). From Miran the route probably moved from one oasis or river valley to the next, along the foothills of the mountains, through sites such as Charklik, Waxxari, Charchan, Endere, Mingfeng, and Niya to Khotan. The route after that probably included Pishan and Yarkand before reaching Kashgar.

The elevation of the routes is relatively high on the slope, with a relatively small change in altitude (an average of 0.7%, -0.6% except at the extremities)., important as the slope would be an important factor for animals carrying heavy packs. Khotan is situated in a pleasant valley that probably protected it from harsh weather.

One of the most useful maps for Khotan's oases is still Stein's, which shows how green and prosperous Khotan could be.

Was it a linear route? 

The general assumption that the Silk Roads connected east and west is an over-simplification. This southern Taklamakan route also connected with trans-Tibetan plateau routes linking Central and South Asia. In addition, the modern hydrology visible on Google Earth suggests a number of south to north courses through the desert; for example from Yotkan to Aksu through Mazar-tagh. The maps published by Aurel Stein also show that movement was not just from east to west, but from south to north as well. However Mazar-tagh is far from the usually accepted Silk Road, in the middle of the desert: there has to be a reason for it being there.

References 

Silk Road